Rowley station is an MBTA Commuter Rail station in Rowley, Massachusetts. It is the penultimate station on the Newburyport branch of the Newburyport/Rockport Line.

History

The small Boston and Maine Railroad (B&M) station building in Rowley was in disrepair by 1961, and was later demolished. Both Rowley and Newburyport were, at the time, outside the MBTA's service district; the town of Newburyport signed a subsidy agreement with the MBTA, allowing it to continue to receive service, but Rowley did not, and its station closed. Newburyport service continued to run until April 2, 1976. 

The current station opened on October 26, 1998, as part of the restoration of service on the Newburyport/Rockport Line between Ipswich and Newburyport.  As with Newburyport, the new station was built with a full-length high-level platform, which allows level boarding for all cars of even the longest MBTA trains.

References

External links

MBTA - Rowley

MBTA Commuter Rail stations in Essex County, Massachusetts
Stations along Boston and Maine Railroad lines
Buildings and structures in Rowley, Massachusetts
Railway stations in the United States opened in 1998